Recordland is one of Venezuela's largest music and video store chains.  It is owned by Empresas 1BC, which is the same owner of Radio Caracas Radio and Radio Caracas Television (RCTV).  Recordland opened in 1982 and now operates 22 stores located throughout the country. On December 15, 2006, Tu Tienda RCTV, a gift shop which sells various products containing the logo of RCTV, ¿Quien Quiere Ser Millonario?, and RCTV's new telenovela, Te Tengo en Salsa, opened in the Recordland at the Centro Sambil in Caracas.

See also
Empresas 1BC
Radio Caracas Radio
RCTV
Venezuelan Album Chart

References

External links
Recordland

Empresas 1BC subsidiaries
Retail companies established in 1982
1982 establishments in Venezuela